Hieronymus van der Mij (1687–1761) was an 18th-century portrait painter from the Northern Netherlands.

He was born in Leiden and was a pupil of Willem van Mieris. He became a teacher and later director of the Leidse Tekenacademie, where his pupils were Pieter Catel, Johannes le Francq van Berkhey, Nicolaas Reyers, Nicolaas Rijnenburg, and Hendrik van Velthoven.
He died in Leiden.

References

External links
 Hieronymus van der Mij on Artnet

1687 births
1761 deaths
18th-century Dutch painters
18th-century Dutch male artists
Dutch male painters
Artists from Leiden
Painters from Leiden